The NXT Championship is a professional wrestling championship created and promoted by the American professional wrestling promotion WWE, defended as the top championship of their NXT brand division. The championship was first introduced on the July 1, 2012, episode of NXT when NXT Commissioner Dusty Rhodes announced a Gold Rush tournament, involving four developmental roster wrestlers and four main roster wrestlers competing to be crowned as the inaugural NXT Champion in a single elimination tournament. Seth Rollins became the inaugural NXT Champion by defeating Jinder Mahal in the tournament finals on July 26, 2012 (aired August 29). 

Samoa Joe has the most reigns at three. Finn Bálor has the longest combined reign at 504 days. Adam Cole's reign is the longest singular reign at  days ( days as recognized by WWE due to tape delay), while Karrion Kross' first reign is the shortest at 4 days (3 days as recognized by WWE) as he had to relinquish the title due to a legitimate injury he suffered in winning it. Bo Dallas holds the record as the youngest champion, winning the title two days before his 23rd birthday (although WWE recognizes it was 18 days after his 23rd birthday due to tape delay), while Samoa Joe is the oldest champion, winning the title at 42.

Bron Breakker is the current champion in his second reign. He defeated Dolph Ziggler on the April 4, 2022, episode of Raw in Dallas, TX; this was the first time the title has changed hands on one of WWE's main roster television programs.

Title history

Combined reigns 

References

External links 
Official NXT Championship title history

WWE NXT championships
WWE championships lists